The Ice Queen is a 2005 novel by Alice Hoffman, published by Little, Brown.

Synopsis

Plot summary
The Ice Queen is a nameless woman who makes a wish as an eight-year-old child that ruins her life. She grows up cold and unfriendly until, as she stands by her kitchen window, she is struck by a bolt of lightning. She survives but is changed: now it's as if she is made of ice. Also, she can no longer see the color red. She hears of a man called Lazarus Jones, who also survived being struck by lightning, and who is reputed to have a heart and soul made of fire. He came back to life after being dead for 40 minutes. They embark on a turbulent love affair whilst trying to hide their secrets: how one became full of fire and the other became made of ice.

References

2005 American novels